Town by Town is the third studio album by the progressive bluegrass collective Yonder Mountain String Band. It was released in 2001 by Frog Pad Records. A song is hidden after three minutes of silence on the track "Peace of Mind".

The song "To See You Coming 'Round the Bend" was sampled by Bubba Sparxxx for the song "Comin' Round" for the album Deliverance.

Track listing

 "Rambler's Anthem" (Ben Kaufmann) – 2:53
 "Easy as Pie" (Dave Johnston) – 3:37
 "Idaho" (Adam Aijala, Carter) – 2:27
 "Loved You Enough" (Johnston) – 2:46
 "Sorrow Is a Highway" (Jeff Austin) – 3:54
 "Must've Had Your Reasons" (Kaufmann) – 3:04
 "Wildewood Drive" (Aijala) – 4:42
 "New Horizons" (Austin) – 7:11
 "Check Out Time" (Benny Galloway, Johnston) – 3:16
 "To See You Coming 'Round the Bend" (Kaufmann) – 3:23
 "Red Tail Lights" (Johnston) – 2:58
 "A Father's Arms" (Aijala) – 3:24
 "Hog Potato" (Johnston) – 3:50
 "Peace of Mind" (Austin) – 12:21
 "Boatman's Dance" [Untitled Hidden Track] – 6:14

Personnel

Yonder Mountain String Band

 Dave Johnston – banjo, vocals
 Jeff Austin – mandolin, vocals
 Ben Kaufmann – bass, vocals
 Adam Aijala – guitar, vocals

Other musicians

 Tim O'Brien – bouzouki, fiddle

Technical

 Lorne Bregitzer – engineer
 David Glasser – mastering
 Tim O'Brien – producer
 Bob Stovern – artwork
 James Tuttle – engineer, mixing
 Michael Weinstein – photography

References

External links
 Yonder Mountain String Band Official Homepage

2001 albums
Yonder Mountain String Band albums
Frog Pad Records albums